The Geschwister-Scholl-Gymnasium in Ludwigshafen, Germany, is a high school established in 1875, and was originally a girls' school.

Subjects 
Students learn English, German as a first language, mathematics, biology, chemistry, physics, music, religious education, French and art.

Schools in Rhineland-Palatinate
Ludwigshafen
Educational institutions established in 1875
1875 establishments in Germany
Hans and Sophie Scholl